Havill is a habitual surname of Anglo-Norman origin. The family descends from landed gentry that originated in mainland Normandy and settled in England following the Norman Conquest. Historically, they have been most prevalent in the South West of England, though several modern branches have emigrated to the United States and New Zealand.

History and etymology
The family is first recorded in the 1086 Domesday Book, in which they are recorded holding large land grants in Warwickshire and later in Berkshire and Norfolk. The name originates from several communes in the modern French region of Normandy, including Héauville in the Manche department, Hauville in the Eure department, and Hauteville-la-Guichard in the Manche department, which lend their name from Hialtt, a 10th-century Norseman who settled in the Cotentin Peninsula and founded the estate of Hialtus villa, giving rise in corrupted form to the family toponymic Hauteville. The name represents the Scandinavian Hjalti or Hialti, but may instead have resulted from confusion with the Helt[us] found in Heltvilla, modern Héauville.  Alternatively, the eponymous Hiallt may be legendary: Hauteville (Altavilla) means simply "high estate". 

Much of the Havill family's early history is shared with the Hauteville family, also of Normandy. It is found in every conceivable form in early registers, with Havill, Hautville, Hauvile, Hauvill, Hauville, Hauvyle, Havele, Havell, Havile, and Haville being the commonest. The ancient Norman de Havilland family settled in Guernsey and Somerset. Many modern Havills are descended from a small group of West Country landowners living in the 17th century who bore the name, including John Havill (1595–1673) and Ellinor Beaton Churchill (1604–1661) of Muston Manor in Piddlehinton.

Distribution
Today, the surname is most common in the United Kingdom and United States, with the highest density found in New Zealand. Within the United Kingdom, it is found predominantly in the West Country and Devon.

Family members by birth
Aaron Havill (born 1969), American music producer
Adrian Havill (born 1940), American author and journalist
Andrew Havill (born 1965), English actor
Clinton H. Havill (1892–1953), American naval officer and aerospace engineer
Lady Edith Kate Havill (1870–1946), wife of Sir Alfred Dyer (1865–1947)
Frederick Havill (1815–1884), English artist and portrait painter
Joan Havill, New Zealand pianist and professor
Juanita Havill (born 1949), American author
Philip Havill (1937), New Zealand first-class cricketer
Steven F. Havill, American author

Family members by marriage
Sir Alfred Dyer (1865–1947), British newspaper editor, politician, and company director
Anthony Herschel Hill (1939–2016), English composer, musician, and professor of music

References

Havill family
Families of French ancestry
Anglo-Norman families
Italo-Norman families